Namozine Creek is a  stream in the U.S. state of Virginia. It is a right-bank tributary of the Appomattox River. Rising in Nottoway County 6 miles (10 km) northeast of the town of Blackstone, Namozine Creek forms the boundary between Dinwiddie County to the south and Nottoway and Amelia counties to the north for nearly its entire length.

Early spellings of the name on property records include "Nummisseen" and "Nammisseen"; numerous variants more similar to the modern spelling, such as "Namozain", "Namozeen", and "Namozene", arose slightly later. "Nummisseen" appears to be of Native American origin, and may have been the name of a tribe who once lived in the area. The name "Namozine" in one form or another was used for the creek at least as far back as the 1720s.

In the early 1800s, Namozine Road (present-day SR 615 in Amelia and Nottoway counties, along with SR 708 in Amelia County) was named after Namozine Creek. "Namozine Road" was revived as the modern designator for the route in the 911 road-name system implemented in the 1990s. The stream also lent its name to "Namozine Flour" in the 1800s, produced by Hobbs Mill on Namozine Creek and sold in local stores. The mill, located on Hobbs Mill Pond off SR 640 (modern-day Hobbs Mill Road) near the Dinwiddie-Nottoway county line, continued to operate until the 1960s. Namozine is also the name of a village in Amelia County, along with a nearby Presbyterian sanctuary, the site of the Battle of Namozine Church in the Civil War; and Namozine is the name of a volunteer fire department near Petersburg.

See also
List of rivers of Virginia

References

USGS Hydrologic Unit Map - State of Virginia (1974)

Rivers of Virginia
Tributaries of the James River
Rivers of Nottoway County, Virginia
Bodies of water of Dinwiddie County, Virginia
Rivers of Amelia County, Virginia